The Brisay hydroelectric generating station is on the Caniapiscau Reservoir, in the Canadian province of Quebec. Part of Hydro-Québec's James Bay Project, the station can generate 469 MW. It was commissioned in 1993. It generates electricity through the reservoir and dam system.

See also 

 List of power stations in Canada
 Reservoirs and dams in Canada

James Bay Project